"Everything" is the second single from the album Elegantly Wasted by INXS. It was released only in Mexico, Europe and Australia. The song was written by Michael Hutchence and Andrew Farriss and recorded by the band in Dublin during the summer of 1996.

B-sides
The first CD single was a four-track live EP of tracks from INXS's performance for the BBC Comic Relief Charity in London. The B-sides on the second CD single included the song, "Let It Ride", which was only included on the Japanese edition of the Elegantly Wasted album. There's also a 12" LP single with two mixes, one the 'Jaxx Club Vocal' and the rare 'Jaxx Love Dub' available only on this format.

Video
The video for the single was shot on 26 April 1997 in Los Angeles  at Ren-Mar Studios in Hollywood. It was directed by Paul Boyd and involved the band performing on a rotating stage with a "crowd" stood in a ring behind them.

Track listings
12" LP single INXX2912 – Mercury/UK
 "Everything" (Jaxx Club Vocal) – 6:39
 "Everything" (Jaxx Love Dub)

CD5 INXCD29 – Single 1 – Mercury/UK
CD5 574 539-2 – Single 1 – Mercury/Australia/Europe

 "Everything" (Live) – 3:37
 "Suicide Blonde" (Live) – 3:57
 "Never Tear Us Apart" (Live) – 3:52
 "What You Need" (Live) – 3:57

CD5 INXDD29 – Single 2 – Mercury/UK
CD5 574 537-2 – Single 2 – Mercury/Australia/Europe

 "Everything" – 3:12
 "Let It Ride" – 3:46
 "Girl on Fire" (Keepin' It Tight Mix) – 4:37
 "Everything" (Jaxx Club Vocal) – 6:39

CD CDP 626-2 – Mercury/Mexico
 "Everything" – 3:12
 "Everything" (Live) – 3:37
 "Everything" (Jaxx Club Vocal) – 6:39

Cassette INXMC 29 – Mercury/UK
Cassette 574 536-4 – Mercury/Europe

 "Everything" – 3:12
 "Let It Ride" – 3:46

Charts

References

1997 singles
INXS songs
Songs written by Andrew Farriss
Songs written by Michael Hutchence
Song recordings produced by Bruce Fairbairn
1997 songs
Mercury Records singles